Efkleidis Somos was a Greek politician and lawyer. Somos was born in Korçë (Korytsa), in modern southern Albania. He was elected as member of the Greek parliament (1915-1917) for the Korytsa prefecture when his homeland came under Greek control.

References

Greek MPs 1915–1917
Northern Epirus independence activists
People from Korçë
20th-century Greek lawyers